Scottish Development International (SDI) is the international arm of the Scottish Government and Scotland's enterprise agencies, Scottish Enterprise, Highlands and Islands Enterprise and South of Scotland Enterprise. The agency supports international investors in Scotland to help set up and grow in Scotland as a gateway to wider European and global markets.

History 
Scottish Development International was established in 2001 by merging the export promotion agency, Scottish Trade International (STI; 1991–2001) and the foreign direct investment and inward investment agency, Locate in Scotland (LiS; 1981–2001).

The agency currently has over 40 offices in around 20 countries across the globe.

References

External links
 Scottish Development International website

2001 establishments in Scotland
Bodies of the Scottish Government
Foreign relations of Scotland
Government agencies established in 2001
Development agencies of Scotland
Export promotion agencies
Trade in Scotland